Andorra competed at the 1992 Summer Olympics in Barcelona, Spain. Eight competitors, seven men and one woman, took part in five events in five sports.

Competitors
The following is the list of number of competitors in the Games.

Athletics

Women

Field events

Cycling

Three male cyclists represented Andorra in 1992.

Road

Men

Judo

Men

Sailing

Men

Shooting

Mixed

References

External links
Official Olympic Reports

Nations at the 1992 Summer Olympics
1992
1992 in Andorran sport